Shantaram More is a Shiv Sena politician from Thane district, Maharashtra. He is a member of the 13th Maharashtra Legislative Assembly. He represents the Bhiwandi Rural Assembly Constituency as member of Shiv Sena.

Positions held
 2012: Elected to Zilla Parishad, Thane Member
 2014: Elected to Maharashtra Legislative Assembly

See also
 Bhiwandi Lok Sabha constituency

References

External links
 Shiv Sena Official website

Maharashtra MLAs 2014–2019
Living people
Shiv Sena politicians
People from Thane district
Marathi politicians
Politics of Thane district
Year of birth missing (living people)